Quintana Roo is a state in southeast Mexico established out of the Quintana Roo Territory in 1974 with seven municipalities, which has since grown into eleven municipalities. According to the 2020 Mexican census, it has the twenty-fourth largest population of all states with  inhabitants and is the 19th largest by land area spanning .

Municipalities in Quintana Roo are administratively autonomous of the state according to the 115th article of the 1917 Constitution of Mexico. Their legal framework derives from the state Constitution. Every three years, citizens elect a municipal president (Spanish: presidente municipal) by a plurality voting system. The president heads a concurrently elected municipal council (ayuntamiento) responsible for providing public services for their constituents. The municipal council consists of trustees and councillors (regidores y síndicos). Municipalities are responsible for public services (such as water and sewerage), street lighting, public safety, traffic, and the maintenance of public parks, gardens and cemeteries. They may also assist the state and federal governments in education, emergency fire and medical services, environmental protection and maintenance of monuments and historical landmarks. Since 1984, they have had the power to collect property taxes and user fees, although more funds are obtained from the state and federal governments than locally.

As of 2020, the largest municipality by population is Benito Juárez with 911,503 residents while the smallest is Isla Mujeres with 22,686 residents.
The newest municipality is Puerto Morelos which was created out of Benito Juárez in 2016.

Municipalities

Notes

References

 
Quintana Roo